Ton Pheung is a district (muang) of Bokeo province in northwestern Laos. The district lies in northwest Laos and borders Tachileik district of Burma and Chiang Saen district and Chiang Khong district of  Chiang Rai province,  Thailand.

History
Given its location, the district has been the center of much conflict in the past. A dispute broke out in 1999 over Thai farmers cultivating on district lands and on 25 February 2008 an attack broke out on the Burmese border involving Burmese drug lords.

Economy
The district economy and also that of Bokeo Province is now dominated by the Golden Triangle Special Economic Zone (GT SEZ) in Ton Pheung District. In 2007, Kings Romans Group, owned by well-connected Chinese husband and wife Zhao Wei and Su Guiqin, entered into a 99 year lease for 10,000 hectares on the banks of the Mekong. The company was granted 3,000 of these hectares as a duty-free zone, now the SEZ. As gambling is illegal in China, and the SEZ is only a two-hour journey by road from China, casinos and hotels catering to a Chinese clientele were built. A robust industry involving trafficking in endangered animals has grown up around the Chinese tourist trade. In January 2018, the US Treasury Department announced sanctions against what it called Zhao’s transnational criminal organisation, engaging in illicit activities, including human trafficking and child prostitution, drug trafficking and wildlife trafficking.

Settlements

 Ban Aychai
 Ban Ayseng
 Ban Bo-Mai
 Ban Chaboti
 Ban Chacho
 Ban Chado
 Ban Chaibo
 Ban Chakham
 Ban Chakhu
 Ban Chalo
 Ban Chap
 Ban Chauva
 Ban Ghapa
 Ban Hali Tia
 Ban Ho
 Ban Houapo
 Ban Houayboulao
 Ban Houaynamnga
 Ban Kang
 Ban Kokka
 Ban Koung
 Ban Kouy
 Ban Kouychakhu
 Ban Lohi
 Ban Mai
 Ban Mai-Muangkhon
 Ban Meo Noua Nam Lave
 Ban Meung
 Ban Meung Hong
 Ban Muanghoung
 Ban Muangkang-Nua
 Ban Namhoy

 Ban Namkhali
 Ban Namkhayao
 Ban Namlem
 Ban Nong Kha
 Ban Oko
 Ban Pan Po Boung
 Ban Paxot
 Ban Pbangoua
 Ban Phagnalouaogkhamping
 Ban Phangoua
 Ban Phoulao
 Ban Sen
 Ban Senphonuang
 Ban Sen Po Meung
 Ban Ta Hou
 Ban Taxoum-Mai
 Ban Thakate
 Ban Tolo
 Ban Tongpalang
 Ban Tongpot
 Ban Xang
 Ban Xiang
 Ban Xiangkheng
 Khas Khouis
 Mugne

References

Districts of Bokeo province